<mapframe
text="Jordan Cove lies within Coos Bay, Oregon"
width=242
height=180
zoom=9
latitude=43.425
longitude=-124.269/>
The Jordan Cove Energy Project was a proposal by Calgary-based energy company Pembina to build a liquefied natural gas export terminal within the International Port of Coos Bay, Oregon. The natural gas would have been transported to the terminal by the Pacific Connector Gas Pipeline. The proposal has been met with objections from landowners, Tribes, and commercial entities since 2010 and was cancelled in late 2021.

Facility
The site proposed for the Jordan Cove Energy Project is located on property controlled by the International Port of Coos Bay, which is zoned for industrial development.
It would have a single marine berth for loading liquefied natural gas and a dedicated tractor tug dock.
The facility is being designed to accommodate about two vessels per week. Each ship will take less than 24 hours to load its cargo. The cost of development at the site is set at $6 billion.

The terminal would employ about 60 people, and construction of the terminal and pipeline would employ about 450 people over more than three years

Pipeline
The buried,  natural gas pipeline would take a diagonal course, heading from Coos Bay southeast to Malin, Oregon. The proposal includes four natural gas meter stations, at Jordan Cove; at milepoint 69.7 in Douglas County; at Shady Cove in Jackson County; and at milepoint 230.9 in Klamath County. The pipeline would terminate at the border between Oregon and California, where it would connect with existing pipeline belonging to Gas Transmission Northwest, Tuscarora Gas, and Pacific Gas and Electric Company, at the proposed Buck Butte, Russell Canyon, and Tule Lake meter stations.
The pipeline would cross the Coast Range between Coos Bay and Roseburg, with its central point near Shady Cove, Oregon. The pipeline route crosses five major rivers: the Coos, Coquille, Rogue, South Umpqua, and Klamath rivers  and would cross land owned by the state, the federal government, and private individuals. About 675 private landowners, would be compensated by the pipeline company for the use of their land, with prices set either through negotiation or via the legal process of eminent domain seizure.
The cost to construct the pipeline was estimated at $1.5 billion.

Power plant
The South Dunes Power Plant is a proposed combined cycle natural gas fueled power plant, built to provide power to the liquefaction facility.  Locating on-site, it would have a peaking capacity of 420 MW. Permitting of the facility falls under the authority of the Oregon Energy Facility Siting Council.

History
According to PBS Newshour the original intent was for the facility to be used to import natural gas into the US, prior to the development of the exploitation of petroleum resources through "fracking".  In December 2007, the Jordan Cove Energy Project and the Pacific Connector Gas Pipeline applied for approval from the Federal Energy Regulatory Commission (FERC). An environmental impact statement for both projects was issued in May 2009. 
The original developers of the Jordan Cove project are Energy Projects Development Limited. The current lead investor in the Jordan Cove terminal is Veresen, an energy infrastructure company based in Calgary, Alberta.
The investors in the pipeline are Williams and Veresen. FERC approved the project in December 2009.  In April 2012, FERC vacated the approval upon notification that the owners would no longer be pursuing an import facility.  In May 2013, Jordan Cove filed applications with FERC to construct and operate a liquefied natural gas export facility. In June 2015, the Confederated Tribes of Coos, Lower Umpqua and Siuslaw Indians, the local Native American tribe, brought their grave concerns before the Jordan Cove Board stating the project directly impacts cultural, historical and archeological resources located throughout Jordan Cove. In July the tribe echoed their concerns in a letter to the Federal Energy Regulatory Committee.

FERC denied the project a permit on March 11, 2016. The reason given was that Veresen had not demonstrated the need for the project, and that the benefits from the project would not outweigh the harm done to individual landowners to justify the use of eminent domain. On March 25, Veresen announced that they had found a potential buyer for the gas that would be exported, which was a consortium of Japanese utilities, but no contracts were signed. They suggested they appeal the decision by FERC and lost that appeal in December 2016. The project was cancelled in late 2021.

Law Enforcement Response and Surveillance
In 2019, it was revealed by The Guardian that opponents of Jordan Cove Energy Project were being monitored by the FBI and other government agencies. A subsequent investigation by The Intercept and Type Investigations, based on more than 15,000 pages of documents obtained via open records requests, found that Pembina Pipeline was the sole source of funding for a unit in the Coos County sheriff department dedicated to handling security concerns related to Jordan Cove. This included purchasing riot control equipment, monitoring the activities of Jordan Cove opponents, and coordinating intelligence-gathering operations with private security companies working for Pembina. They also funded a two-day training in November 2018, organized by the National Sheriffs’ Association. 

Despite no evidence of committing crimes, these investigations documented how the environmental and Indigenous groups opposing the pipeline were surveilled by the Oregon TITAN Fusion Center under the pretext of "counterterrorism." In 2021, individuals surveilled by the Fusion Center filed a lawsuit, alleging that the monitoring of activists was illegal.

Reactions
The Jordan Cove LNG project has been long opposed by impacted communities, including landowners, Tribes, commercial fishermen, and more across Southern Oregon for over a decade. In 2018, a poll found 57 percent either strongly opposed or leaned toward opposing the Jordan Cove Energy Project, versus 22 percent who either leaned toward supporting or strongly supported the project. US Senator Jeff Merkley and US Representative Peter Defazio publicly opposed this project. 

Facing widespread opposition and lacking a number of key permits necessary for construction, the project stalled out in 2020. In 2022, Pembina announced that the pipeline and export terminal would not be built, and the project was permanently canceled.

References

External links
Jordan Cove Energy Project, https://web.archive.org/web/20100512034328/http://jordancoveenergy.com/
Pacific Connector Gas Pipeline, http://www.pacificconnectorgp.com/
Citizens Against LNG, http://www.citizensagainstlng.com
Rogue Riverkeeper, http://rogueriverkeeper.org/lng

 

Coos Bay, Oregon
Energy infrastructure in Oregon
Liquefied natural gas plants
Proposed liquefied natural gas terminals